The  Little League World Series, was held in South Williamsport, Pennsylvania. It began on August 15 and ended August 24. Eight teams from the United States and eight from throughout the world competed to decide the winner of the 62nd installment of the Little League World Series. In the championship game, the United States champions from Waipi`o, Hawaii defeated the international champions from Matamoros, Mexico. This was the last iteration of the Little League World Series in which the international champions did not originate from an East Asian country until 2019.

Activision released a video game in advance of the event, Little League World Series Baseball 2008.

Teams

Results

Pool play
The top two teams in each pool moved on to their respective semifinals. The winners of each met on August 24 to play for the Little League World Championship. Teams marked in green qualified to the knockout stage.

Ties are broken based on records in head-to-head competition among tied teams. In the event of a three-way tie for first place, the tie is broken by calculating the ratio of runs allowed to defensive innings played for all teams involved in the tie. The team with the lowest runs-per-defensive-inning ratio is ranked first and advances. Second place is determined by the head-to-head result of the other two teams. If the three-way tie is for 2nd place, the runs-per-defensive-inning ratio rule is used. The team with the lowest run ratio advances, the other two teams are eliminated.

Louisiana wins pool based on defensive run ratio. Washington is the runner-up based on win against Maryland.

All times US EDT.

International

All times US EDT.

Elimination round

Champions path
According to the information provided at Unpage.com, the Waipio LL won 5 matches and lost 1 match to reach the LLWS. In total, their record was 16–2, their only losses coming against Central East Maui LL (from Hawaii), and Paseo Verde LL (from Nevada).

References

External links
2008 official results via Wayback Machine

 
Little League World Series
Little League World Series
Little League World Series